Pandercetes decipiens, is a species of spider of the genus Pandercetes. It is native to India and Sri Lanka.

See also
 List of Sparassidae species

References

Sparassidae
Arthropods of Sri Lanka
Spiders of Asia
Spiders described in 1899